Patnaik/ Pattnaik/ Pattanayak/ Pattanaik / Pattnayak is a native Odia surname native to Odisha, northeastern districts of Andhra Pradesh and southern districts of West Bengal in India.

Notable people
Notable people with the surname include:

Ananga Kumar Patnaik (born 1949), Indian jurist, currently serving on the Supreme Court of India
Arup Patnaik (born 1955), Former Police Commissioner of Mumbai, first and only Odia IPS officer to hold the post
Biju Patnaik (1916–1997), Indian politician
D. B. M. Patnaik (1925–2009), Indian lawyer, politician and communist leader
Devdutt Pattanaik (born 1970), Indian mythologist, writer and columnist
Devraj Patnaik (born 1975), Canadian-born composer, musician and choreographer
Donkada Patnaik (1925–2009), Indian solicitor and politician
Ellora Patnaik (born 1968), Canadian-born actress and Odissi dancer
Gopal Ballav Pattanaik (born 1937), Former Chief Justice of India 
Hara Patnaik (1958–2015), Oriya actor, film director and screenwriter
Ila Patnaik, Indian economist and a financial journalist
Jagabandhu Patnaik, dewan of Raja Arjun Singh of Porahat
Janaki Ballabh Patnaik (1927-2015), was leader of the Indian National Congress and former chief minister of Orissa
Naveen Patnaik (born 1946), the Chief Minister of Orissa, India
Niranjan Patnaik - Indian politician. OPCC chief
Prabhat Patnaik (born 1945), Indian Marxist economist and political commentator
R. P. Patnaik, Indian film music director
Raghunath Patnaik - veteran leader of the Indian National Congress
Soumya Ranjan Patnaik - diversified business, print media, electronic media, FM radio and operas; member of Parliament Rajya Sabha
Sudarshan Patnaik (born 1977), inventor of sand art in India
Sudhir Pattnaik - journalist and a social activist of Odisha
Utsa Patnaik - Indian Marxist economist

See also
Biju Patnaik Airport, also known as Bhubaneswar Airport in Bhubaneswar, Orissa, India
Biju Patnaik University of Technology, created by an act of the Orissa state legislature in 2002

References

Surnames of Indian origin